University of Notre Dame Environmental Research Center (UNDERC) has two locations in North America serving as natural laboratories for scientists studying ecology and environmental biology. These locations serve as "natural" laboratories for the study of environmental systems that have experienced little or no degradation from humans and as a baseline for comparison with human disturbed systems.

UNDERC-EAST

UNDERC-East  encompasses  (land =  and lakes/bogs/streams = ) lying at  along the state line of Wisconsin (Vilas County) and Michigan (Gogebic County). UNDERC-East is the National Ecological Observatory Network (NEON) site for increasing the understanding of how forest management impacts ecological processes in the Great Lakes Region (Domain #5).

UNDERC-WEST

UNDERC-West encompasses more than  administered by the Confederated Salish and Kootenai Tribes  with whom the University of Notre Dame partners in the UNDERC-West project.

Notable Researchers 

 Arthur Hasler
 Edward Birge
 Chancey Juday
 David Lodge
 James Elser
 James Kitchell 
 Stephen Carpenter
 Kathryn L. Cottingham

References

External links
 UNDERC official website

University of Notre Dame buildings and structures
Nature reserves in Michigan
Research institutes in the United States
Biological research institutes in the United States
Ecological experiments
Ecology organizations
Protected areas of Gogebic County, Michigan
Protected areas of Vilas County, Wisconsin
Geography of Lake County, Montana
University of Notre Dame